Distance education, also known as distance learning, is the education of students who may not always be physically present at a school, or where the learner and the teacher are separated in both time and distance. Traditionally, this usually involved correspondence courses wherein the student corresponded with the school via mail. Distance education is a technology mediated modality and has evolved with the evolution of technologies such as video conferencing, TV, and internet. Today, it usually involves online education and the learning is usually mediated by some form of technology. A distance learning program can be completely distance learning, or a combination of distance learning and traditional classroom instruction (called hybrid or blended). Other modalities include distance learning with complementary virtual environment or teaching in virtual environment (e-learning).

Massive open online courses (MOOCs), offering large-scale interactive participation and open access through the World Wide Web or other network technologies, are recent educational modes in distance education. A number of other terms (distributed learning, e-learning, m-learning, online learning, virtual classroom, etc.) are used roughly synonymously with distance education. E-learning has shown to be a useful educational tool. E-learning should be an interactive process with multiple learning modes for all learners at various levels of learning. The distance learning environment is an exciting place to learn new things, collaborate with others, and retain self-discipline.

History 
One of the earliest attempts of distance education was advertised in 1728. This was in the Boston Gazette for "Caleb Philipps, Teacher of the new method of Short Hand", who sought students who wanted to learn the skills through weekly mailed lessons.

The first distance education course in the modern sense was provided by Sir Isaac Pitman in the 1840s who taught a system of shorthand by mailing texts transcribed into shorthand on postcards and receiving transcriptions from his students in return for correction. The element of student feedback was a crucial innovation in Pitman's system. This scheme was made possible by the introduction of uniform postage rates across England in 1840.

This early beginning proved extremely successful and the Phonographic Correspondence Society was founded three years later to establish these courses on a more formal basis. The society paved the way for the later formation of Sir Isaac Pitman Colleges across the country.

The first correspondence school in the United States was the Society to Encourage Studies at Home which was founded in 1873.

Founded in 1894, Wolsey Hall, Oxford was the first distance learning college in the UK.

University correspondence courses 
The University of London was the first university to offer distance learning degrees, establishing its External Programme in 1858. The background to this innovation lay in the fact that the institution (later known as University College London) was non-denominational and the intense religious rivalries at the time led to an outcry against the "godless" university. The issue soon boiled down to which institutions had degree-granting powers and which institutions did not.

The compromise that emerged in 1836 was that the sole authority to conduct the examinations leading to degrees would be given to a new officially recognized entity, the "University of London", which would act as examining body for the University of London colleges, originally University College London and King's College London, and award their students University of London degrees. As Sheldon Rothblatt states: "Thus arose in nearly archetypal form the famous English distinction between teaching and examining, here embodied in separate institutions."

With the state giving examining powers to a separate entity, the groundwork was laid for the creation of a programme within the new university which would both administer examinations and award qualifications to students taking instruction at another institution or pursuing a course of self-directed study. Referred to as "People's University" by Charles Dickens because it provided access to higher education to students from less affluent backgrounds, the External Programme was chartered by Queen Victoria in 1858, making the University of London the first university to offer distance learning degrees to students. Enrollment increased steadily during the late 19th century, and its example was widely copied elsewhere. This programme is now known as the University of London International Programme and includes Postgraduate, Undergraduate and Diploma degrees created by colleges such as the London School of Economics, Royal Holloway and Goldsmiths.

In the United States, William Rainey Harper, founder and first president of the University of Chicago, celebrated the concept of extended education, where a research university had satellite colleges elsewhere in the region.

In 1892, Harper encouraged correspondence courses to further promote education, an idea that was put into practice by Chicago, Wisconsin, Columbia, and several dozen other universities by the 1920s. Enrollment in the largest private for-profit school based in Scranton, Pennsylvania, the International Correspondence Schools grew explosively in the 1890s. Founded in 1888 to provide training for immigrant coal miners aiming to become state mine inspectors or foremen, it enrolled 2500 new students in 1894 and matriculated 72,000 new students in 1895. By 1906 total enrollments reached 900,000. The growth was due to sending out complete textbooks instead of single lessons, and the use of 1200 aggressive in-person salesmen. There was a stark contrast in pedagogy:

Education was a high priority in the Progressive Era, as American high schools and colleges expanded greatly. For men who were older or were too busy with family responsibilities, night schools were opened, such as the YMCA school in Boston that became Northeastern University. Outside the big cities, private correspondence schools offered a flexible, narrowly focused solution. Large corporations systematized their training programmes for new employees. The National Association of Corporation Schools grew from 37 in 1913 to 146 in 1920. Starting in the 1880s, private schools opened across the country which offered specialized technical training to anyone who enrolled, not just the employees of one company. Starting in Milwaukee in 1907, public schools began opening free vocational programmes.

Only a third of the American population lived in cities of 100,000 or more population in 1920; to reach the rest, correspondence techniques had to be adopted. Australia, with its vast distances, was especially active; the University of Queensland established its Department of Correspondence Studies in 1911. In South Africa, the University of South Africa, formerly an examining and certification body, started to present distance education tuition in 1946. The International Conference for Correspondence Education held its first meeting in 1938. The goal was to provide individualised education for students, at low cost, by using a pedagogy of testing, recording, classification, and differentiation. The organization has since been renamed as the International Council for Open and Distance Education (ICDE), with headquarters in Oslo, Norway.

Open universities 

The Open University (OU) the United Kingdom was founded by the-then Labour government led by  Harold Wilson. Based on the vision of Michael Young, planning commenced in 1965 under the Minister of State for Education, Jennie Lee, who established a model for the Open University as one of widening access to the highest standards of scholarship in higher education and set up a planning committee consisting of university vice-chancellors, educationalists, and television broadcasters, chaired by Sir Peter Venables. The British Broadcasting Corporation's (BBC) Assistant Director of Engineering at the time, James Redmond, had obtained most of his qualifications at night school, and his natural enthusiasm for the project did much to overcome the technical difficulties of using television to broadcast teaching programmes.

The Open University revolutionised the scope of the correspondence programme and helped to create a respectable learning alternative to the traditional form of education. It has been at the forefront of developing new technologies to improve the distance learning service as well as undertaking research in other disciplines. Walter Perry was appointed the OU's first vice-chancellor in January 1969, and its foundation secretary was Anastasios Christodoulou. The election of the new Conservative government under the leadership of Edward Heath, in 1970; led to budget cuts under Chancellor of the Exchequer Iain Macleod (who had earlier called the idea of an Open University "blithering nonsense"). However, the OU accepted its first 25,000 students in 1971, adopting a radical open admissions policy. At the time, the total student population of conventional universities in the United Kingdom was around 130,000.

Athabasca University, Canada's open university, was created in 1970 and followed a similar, though independently developed, pattern. The Open University inspired the creation of Spain's National University of Distance Education (1972) and Germany's FernUniversität in Hagen (1974). There are now many similar institutions around the world, often with the name "Open University" (in English or in the local language).

The University of the Philippines Open University was established in 1995 as the fifth constituent university of the University of the Philippines System and was the first distance education and online university in the Philippines. Its mandate is to provide education opportunities to individuals aspiring for higher education and improved qualifications but were unable to take advantage of traditional modes of education because of personal and professional obligations.

Most open universities use distance education technologies as delivery methods, though some require attendance at local study centres or at regional "summer schools". Some open universities have grown to become mega-universities.

COVID-19 pandemic

The COVID-19 pandemic resulted in the closure of the vast majority of schools worldwide for in person learning. Many schools moved to online remote learning through platforms including—but not limited to—Zoom, Cisco Webex, Google Classroom, Google Meet, Microsoft Teams, D2L, and Edgenuity. Concerns arose over the impact of this transition on students without access to an internet-enabled device or a stable internet connection. Distanced education during the COVID-19 pandemic has interrupted synchronous learning for many students and teachers; where educators were no longer able to teach in real time and could only switch to asynchronous instruction, this significantly and negatively affected their coping with the transition, and posed various legal issues, especially in terms of copyright. A recent study about the benefits and drawbacks of online learning found that students have had a harder time producing their own work. The study suggests teachers should cut back on the amount of information taught and incorporate more activities during the lesson, in order for students to create their own work.

Though schools are slow to adapt to new technologies, Covid-19 required schools to adapt and learn how to use new digital and online learning tools. Web conferencing has become more popular since 2007. Researchers have found that people in online classes perform just as effectively as participants in conventional learning classes. The use of online learning is becoming a pathway for learners with sparse access to physical courses so they can complete their degrees. Furthermore, digital classroom technologies allow those living remotely to access learning and it enables the student to fit learning into their schedule more easily.

Technologies 
Internet technology has enabled many forms of distance learning through open educational resources and facilities such as e-learning and MOOCs. Although the expansion of the Internet blurs the boundaries, distance education technologies are divided into two modes of delivery: synchronous learning and asynchronous learning.

In synchronous learning, all participants are "present" at the same time in a virtual classroom, as in traditional classroom teaching.  It requires a timetable.  Web conferencing, videoconferencing, educational television, instructional television are examples of synchronous technology, as are direct-broadcast satellite (DBS), internet radio, live streaming, telephone, and web-based VoIP.

Web conferencing software helps to facilitate class meetings, and usually contains additional interaction tools such as text chat, polls, hand raising, emoticons etc.  These tools also support asynchronous participation by students who can listen to recordings of synchronous sessions.  Immersive environments (notably SecondLife) have also been used to enhance participant presence in distance education courses.  Another form of synchronous learning using the classroom is the use of robot proxies including those that allow sick students to attend classes.

Some universities have been starting to use robot proxies to enable more engaging synchronous hybrid classes where both remote and in-person students can be present and interact using telerobotics devices such as the Kubi Telepresence robot stand that looks around and the Double Robot that roams around. With these telepresence robots, the remote students have a seat at the table or desk instead of being on a screen on the wall.

In asynchronous learning, participants access course materials flexibly on their own schedules. Students are not required to be together at the same time. Mail correspondence, which is the oldest form of distance education, is an asynchronous delivery technology, as are message board forums, e-mail, video and audio recordings, print materials, voicemail, and fax.

The two methods can be combined. Many courses offered by both open universities and an increasing number of campus-based institutions use periodic sessions of residential or day teaching to supplement the sessions delivered at a distance. This type of mixed distance and campus-based education has recently come to be called "blended learning" or less often "hybrid learning". Many open universities use a blend of technologies and a blend of learning modalities (face-to-face, distance, and hybrid) all under the rubric of "distance learning".

Distance learning can also use interactive radio instruction (IRI), interactive audio instruction (IAI), online virtual worlds, digital games, webinars, and webcasts, all of which are referred to as e-Learning.

Radio and television 

The rapid spread of film in the 1920s and radio in the 1930s led to proposals to use it for distance education. By 1938, at least 200 city school systems, 25 state boards of education, and many colleges and universities broadcast educational programmes for the public schools. One line of thought was to use radio as a master teacher.

The first large-scale implementation of radio for distance education took place in 1937 in Chicago. During a three-week school closure implemented in response to a polio outbreak that the city was experiencing, superintendent of Chicago Public Schools William Johnson and assistant superintendent Minnie Fallon implemented a programme of distance learning that provided the city's elementary school students with instruction through radio broadcasts.

A typical setup came in Kentucky in 1948 when John Wilkinson Taylor, president of the University of Louisville, teamed up with NBC to use radio as a medium for distance education, The chairman of the Federal Communications Commission endorsed the project and predicted that the "college-by-radio" would put "American education 25 years ahead". The university was owned by the city, and local residents would pay the low tuition rates, receive their study materials in the mail, and listen by radio to live classroom discussions that were held on campus. Physicist Daniel Q. Posin also was a pioneer in the field of distance education when he hosted a televised course through DePaul University.

Charles Wedemeyer of the University of Wisconsin–Madison also promoted new methods. From 1964 to 1968, the Carnegie Foundation funded Wedemeyer's Articulated Instructional Media Project (AIM) which brought in a variety of communications technologies aimed at providing learning to an off-campus population. The radio courses faded away in the 1950s. Many efforts to use television along the same lines proved unsuccessful, despite heavy funding by the Ford Foundation.

From 1970 to 1972 the Coordinating Commission for Higher Education in California funded Project Outreach to study the potential of telecourses. The study included the University of California, California State University, and the community colleges. This study led to coordinated instructional systems legislation allowing the use of public funds for non-classroom instruction and paved the way for the emergence of telecourses as the precursor to the online courses and programmes of today. The Coastline Community Colleges, The Dallas County Community College District, and Miami Dade Community College led the way. The Adult Learning Service of the US Public Broadcasting Service came into being and the "wrapped" series, and individually produced telecourse for credit became a significant part of the history of distance education and online learning.

Internet 
The widespread use of computers and the Internet has made distance learning easier and faster, and today virtual schools and virtual universities deliver full curricula online. The capacity of Internet to support voice, video, text and immersion teaching methods made earlier distinct forms of telephone, videoconferencing, radio, television, and text based education somewhat redundant. However, many of the techniques developed and lessons learned with earlier media are used in Internet delivery.

The first totally online courses for graduate and undergraduate credit were offered in 1985 by Connected Education through The New School in New York City, with students earning the MA in Media Studies completely online via computer conferencing, with no in-person requirements. This was followed in 1986 by the University of Toronto through the Graduate School of Education (then called OISE: the Ontario Institute for Studies in Education), offering a course in "Women and Computers in Education", dealing with gender issues and educational computing.  The first new and fully online university was founded in 1994 as the Open University of Catalonia, headquartered in Barcelona, Spain. In 1999 Jones International University was launched as the first fully online university accredited by a regional accrediting association in the US.

Between 2000 and 2008, enrollment in distance education courses increased rapidly in almost every country in both developed and developing countries. Many private, public, non-profit and for-profit institutions worldwide now offer distance education courses from the most basic instruction through to the highest levels of degree and doctoral programmes. New York University and the International University Canada, for example, offers online degrees in engineering and management-related fields through NYU Tandon Online. Levels of accreditation vary: widely respected universities such as Stanford University and Harvard now deliver online courses—but other online schools receive little outside oversight, and some are actually fraudulent, i.e., diploma mills. In the US, the Distance Education Accrediting Commission (DEAC) specializes in the accreditation of distance education institutions.

In the United States in 2011, it was found that a third of all the students enrolled in postsecondary education had taken an accredited online course in a postsecondary institution.  Growth continued.  In 2013 the majority of public and private colleges offered full academic programmes online. Programmes included training in the mental health, occupational therapy, family therapy, art therapy, physical therapy, and rehabilitation counseling fields.

By 2008, online learning programmes were available in the United States in 44 states at the K-12 level.

Internet forums, online discussion group and online learning community can contribute to a distance education experience. Research shows that socialization plays an important role in some forms of distance education.

ECourses are available from educational platforms such as Khan Academy and MasterClass on many topics and for students of all levels.

Paced and self-paced models 
Most distance education uses a paced format similar to traditional campus-based models in which learners commence and complete a course at the same time.  Some institutions offer self-paced programmes that allow for continuous enrollment, and the length of time to complete the course is set by the learner's time, skill, and commitment levels.  Self-paced courses are almost always offered asynchronously.  Each delivery method offers advantages and disadvantages for students, teachers, and institutions.

Kaplan and Haenlein classify distance education into four groups according to "Time dependency" and "Number of participants": 
 MOOCs (Massive Open Online Courses): Open-access online course (i.e., without specific participation restrictions) that allows for unlimited (massive) participation; 
 SPOCs (Small Private Online Courses): Online course that only offers a limited number of places and therefore requires some form of formal enrollment;
 SMOCs (Synchronous Massive Online Courses): Open-access online course that allows for unlimited participation but requires students to be "present" at the same time (synchronously);
 SSOCs (Synchronous Private Online Courses): Online course that only offers a limited number of places and requires students to be "present" at the same time (synchronously).

Paced models are a familiar mode since they are used almost exclusively in campus-based schools. Institutes that offer both distance and campus programmes usually use paced models so that teacher workload, student semester planning, tuition deadlines, exam schedules, and other administrative details can be synchronized with campus delivery. Student familiarity and the pressure of deadlines encourages students to readily adapt to and usually succeed in paced models. However, student freedom is sacrificed as a common pace is often too fast for some students and too slow for others. In additional life events, professional or family responsibilities can interfere with a student's capability to complete tasks to an external schedule. Finally, paced models allow students to readily form communities of inquiry and to engage in collaborative work.

Self-paced courses maximize student freedom, as not only can students commence studies on any date, but they can complete a course in as little time as a few weeks or up to a year or longer. Students often enroll in self-paced study when they are under pressure to complete programmes, have not been able to complete a scheduled course, need additional courses, or have pressure which precludes regular study for any length of time. The self-paced nature of the programming, though, is an unfamiliar model for many students and can lead to excessive procrastination, resulting in course incompletion. Assessment of learning can also be challenging as exams can be written on any day, making it possible for students to share examination questions with resulting loss of academic integrity. Finally, it is extremely challenging to organize collaborative work activities, though some schools are developing cooperative models based upon networked and connectivist pedagogies for use in self-paced programmes.

Benefits 
Distance learning can expand access to education and training for both general populace and businesses since its flexible scheduling structure lessens the effects of the many time-constraints imposed by personal responsibilities and commitments. Devolving some activities off-site alleviates institutional capacity constraints arising from the traditional demand on institutional buildings and infrastructure. As a result, more classes can be offered and enable students to enroll in more of their required classes on time and prevent delayed graduation. Furthermore, there is the potential for increased access to more experts in the field and to other students from diverse geographical, social, cultural, economic, and experiential backgrounds.
As the population at large becomes more involved in lifelong learning beyond the normal schooling age, institutions can benefit financially, and adult learning business courses may be particularly lucrative. Distance education programmes can act as a catalyst for institutional innovation and are at least as effective as face-to-face learning programmes, especially if the instructor is knowledgeable and skilled.

Distance education can also provide a broader method of communication within the realm of education. With the many tools and programmes that technological advancements have to offer, communication appears to increase in distance education amongst students and their professors, as well as students and their classmates. The distance educational increase in communication, particularly communication amongst students and their classmates, is an improvement that has been made to provide distance education students with as many of the opportunities as possible as they would receive in in-person education. The improvement being made in distance education is growing in tandem with the constant technological advancements. Present-day online communication allows students to associate with accredited schools and programmes throughout the world that are out of reach for in-person learning. By having the opportunity to be involved in global institutions via distance education, a diverse array of thought is presented to students through communication with their classmates. This is beneficial because students have the opportunity to "combine new opinions with their own, and develop a solid foundation for learning". It has been shown through research that "as learners become aware of the variations in interpretation and construction of meaning among a range of people [they] construct an individual meaning", which can help students become knowledgeable of a wide array of viewpoints in education. To increase the likelihood that students will build effective ties with one another during the course, instructors should use similar assignments for students across different locations to overcome the influence of co-location on relationship building.

The high cost of education affects students in higher education, to which distance education may be an alternative in order to provide some relief. Distance education has been a more cost-effective form of learning, and can sometimes save students a significant amount of money as opposed to traditional education. Distance education may be able to help to save students a considerable amount financially by removing the cost of transportation. In addition, distance education may be able to save students from the economic burden of high-priced course textbooks. Many textbooks are now available as electronic textbooks, known as e-textbooks, which can offer digital textbooks for a reduced price in comparison to traditional textbooks. Also, the increasing improvements in technology have resulted in many school libraries having a partnership with digital publishers that offer course materials for free, which can help students significantly with educational costs.

Within the class, students are able to learn in ways that traditional classrooms would not be able to provide. It is able to promote good learning experiences and therefore, allow students to obtain higher satisfaction with their online learning. For example, students can review their lessons more than once according to their needs. Students can then manipulate the coursework to fit their learning by focusing more on their weaker topics while breezing through concepts that they already have or can easily grasp. When course design and the learning environment are at their optimal conditions, distance education can lead students to higher satisfaction with their learning experiences. Studies have shown that high satisfaction correlates to increased learning. For those in a healthcare or mental health distance learning programme, online-based interactions have the potential to foster deeper reflections and discussions of client issues as well as a quicker response to client issues, since supervision happens on a regular basis and is not limited to a weekly supervision meeting. This also may contribute to the students feeling a greater sense of support, since they have ongoing and regular access to their instructors and other students.

Distance learning may enable students who are unable to attend a traditional school setting, due to disability or illness such as decreased mobility and immune system suppression, to get a good education. Children who are sick or are unable to attend classes are able to attend them in "person" through the use of robot proxies. This helps the students have experiences of the classroom and social interaction that they are unable to receive at home or the hospital, while still keeping them in a safe learning environment. Over the last few years more students are entering safely back into the classroom thanks to the help of robots. An article from the New York Times, "A Swiveling Proxy Will Even Wear a Tutu", explains the positive impact of virtual learning in the classroom, and another that explains how even a simple, stationary telepresence robot can help.
Distance education may provide equal access regardless of socioeconomic status or income, area of residence, gender, race, age, or cost per student. Applying universal design strategies to distance learning courses as they are being developed (rather than instituting accommodations for specific students on an as-needed basis) can increase the accessibility of such courses to students with a range of abilities, disabilities, learning styles, and native languages.
Distance education graduates, who would never have been associated with the school under a traditional system, may donate money to the school.

Distance learning may also offer a final opportunity for adolescents that are no longer permitted in the general education population due to behavior disorders. Instead of these students having no other academic opportunities, they may continue their education from their homes and earn their diplomas, offering them another chance to be an integral part of society.

Distance learning offers individuals a unique opportunity to benefit from the expertise and resources of the best universities currently available. Moreover, the online environment facilitates pedagogical innovation such as new programme structures and formats. Students have the ability to collaborate, share, question, infer, and suggest new methods and techniques for continuous improvement of the content. The ability to complete a course at a pace that is appropriate for each individual is the most effective manner to learn given the personal demands on time and schedule. Self-paced distance learning on a mobile device, such as a smartphone, provides maximum flexibility and capability.

Distance learning can also reduce the phenomenon of rural exodus by enabling students from remote regions to remain in their hometowns while pursuing higher education. Eliminating the distance barrier to higher education can also increase the number of alternatives open to students, and foster greater competition between institutions of higher learning regardless of geography.

Criticism 
Barriers to effective distance education include obstacles such as domestic distractions and unreliable technology, as well as students' programme costs, adequate contact with teachers and support services, and a need for more experience.

Some students attempt to participate in distance education without proper training with the tools needed to be successful in the programme. Students must be provided with training opportunities (if needed) on each tool that is used throughout the programme. The lack of advanced technology skills can lead to an unsuccessful experience. Schools have a responsibility to adopt a proactive policy for managing technology barriers. Time management skills and self-discipline in distance education is just as important as complete knowledge of the software and tools being used for learning.

The results of a study of Washington state community college students showed that distance learning students tended to drop out more often than their traditional counterparts due to difficulties in language, time management, and study skills.

According to Dr. Pankaj Singhm, director of Nims University, "distance learning benefits may outweigh the disadvantages for students in such a technology-driven society, however before indulging into the use of educational technology a few more disadvantages should be considered." He describes that over multiple years, "all of the obstacles have been overcome and the world environment for distance education continues to improve." Dr. Pankaj Singhm also claims there is a debate to distance education stating, "due to a lack of direct face-to-face social interaction. However, as more people become used to personal and social interaction online (for example dating, chat rooms, shopping, or blogging), it is becoming easier for learners to both project themselves and socializes with others. This is an obstacle that has dissipated."

Not all courses required to complete a degree may be offered online. Health care profession programmes in particular require some sort of patient interaction through fieldwork before a student may graduate. Studies have also shown that students pursuing a medical professional graduate degree who are participating in distance education courses, favor a face to face communication over professor-mediated chat rooms and/or independent studies. However, this is little correlation between student performance when comparing the previous different distance learning strategies.

There is a theoretical problem about the application of traditional teaching methods to online courses because online courses may have no upper size limit. Daniel Barwick noted that there is no evidence that large class size is always worse or that small class size is always better, although a negative link has been established between certain types of instruction in large classes and learning outcomes; he argued that higher education has not made a sufficient effort to experiment with a variety of instructional methods to determine whether large class size is always negatively correlated with a reduction in learning outcomes. Early proponents of Massive Open Online Courses (MOOCs) saw them as just the type of experiment that Barwick had pointed out was lacking in higher education, although Barwick himself has never advocated for MOOCs.

There may also be institutional challenges. Distance learning is new enough that it may be a challenge to gain support for these programmes in a traditional brick-and-mortar academic learning environment. Furthermore, it may be more difficult for the instructor to organize and plan a distance learning programme, especially since many are new programmes and their organizational needs are different from a traditional learning programme.

Additionally, though distance education offers industrial countries the opportunity to become globally informed, there are still negative sides to it. Hellman states that "These include its cost and capital intensiveness, time constraints and other pressures on instructors, the isolation of students from instructors and their peers, instructors' enormous difficulty in adequately evaluating students they never meet face-to-face, and drop-out rates far higher than in classroom-based courses."

A more complex challenge of distance education relates to cultural differences between students and teachers and among students. Distance programmes tend to be more diverse as they could go beyond the geographical borders of regions, countries, and continents, and cross the cultural borders that may exist with respect to race, gender, and religion. That requires a proper understanding and awareness of the norms, differences, preconceptions, and potential conflicting issues.

Educational technology 
The modern use of electronic educational technology (also called e-learning) facilitates distance learning and independent learning by the extensive use of information and communications technology (ICT), replacing traditional content delivery by postal correspondence. Instruction can be synchronous and asynchronous online communication in an interactive learning environment or virtual communities, in lieu of a physical classroom. "The focus is shifted to the education transaction in the form of a virtual community of learners sustainable across time."

One of the most significant issues encountered in the mainstream correspondence model of distance education is the transactional distance, which results from the lack of appropriate communication between learner and teacher. This gap has been observed to become wider if there is no communication between the learner and teacher and has direct implications over the learning process and future endeavors in distance education. Distance education providers began to introduce various strategies, techniques, and procedures to increase the amount of interaction between learners and teachers. These measures e.g. more frequent face-to-face tutorials, increased use of information and communication technologies including teleconferencing and the Internet, were designed to close the gap in transactional distance.

Credentials 

Online credentials for learning are digital credentials that are offered in place of traditional paper credentials for a skill or educational achievement. Directly linked to the accelerated development of internet communication technologies, the development of digital badges, electronic passports and massive open online courses (MOOCs) have a very direct bearing on our understanding of learning, recognition and levels as they pose a direct challenge to the status quo. It is useful to distinguish between three forms of online credentials: Test-based credentials, online badges, and online certificates.

See also 
 Degree completion program
 Digital divide
 Distance and on-line learning advocates
 Herbert Gross
 Linda Harasim
 Educational technology
 Homeschooling
 Learning environment
 Low-residency program
 Media psychology
 New media
 Online school
 Open supported learning
 Open-door academic policy
 Qualifications frameworks for online learning
 School of the Air, distance education in Australia
 Sunrise Semester
 Videotelephony
 Virtual education

Sources

References

Further reading 
Anderson, T. (2008). Theory and Practice of Online Education (2nd ed) 
 Anderson, T., & Dron, J. (2010). Three generations of distance education pedagogy. The International Review of Research in Open and Distance Learning, 12(3), 80–97.
 Bates, T. (2005). Technology, e-learning and distance education: RoutledgeFalmer.
 
 
Holmberg, Börje. (1995). Theory and Practice of Distance Education (2nd ed) online
 Jacob, J.U., Ensign M. (2020). Transactional Radio Instruction: Improving Educational Outcomes for Children in Conflict Zones, Palgrave Macmillan, Cham. DOI: https://doi.org/10.1007/978-3-030-32369-1.
 Kett, Joseph F. (1994). Pursuit of Knowledge Under Difficulties: From Self-Improvement to Adult Education in America 
  online edition
Major, C. H. (2015). Teaching online: A guide to theory, research, and practice. (Johns Hopkins University Press).
 Moore, M. G. (1990). Contemporary issues in American distance education (Ed.)
 Peters, O. (1994). Distance education and industrial production: A comparative interpretation in outline(1973). Otto Peters on distance education: The industrialization of teaching and learning, 107–127.
 Saba, F. (2011). Distance Education in the United States: Past, Present, Future. Educational Technology, 51(6), 11.
Stubblefield, Harold W., and Patrick Keane.  (1994). Adult Education in the American Experience: From the Colonial Period to the Present  
 Taylor, J. C. (2001). Fifth-generation distance education. e-Journal of Instructional Science and Technology (e-JIST), 4(1), 1-14.
 Terry Evans, M. H., David Murphy (Ed.). (2008). International Handbook of Distance Education. Bingley: Emerald Group Publishing Limited.
 Walsh, T. (2011). Unlocking the Gates: How and Why Leading Universities Are Opening Up Access to Their Courses (Princeton University Press, 2011) online

External links 

 
 "Radio in education" full-text books and articles online; from 1930s and 1940s
 "Issues in Distance Education book series from Athabasca University Press" . A series of over 10 books related to distance education research. Available in print for sale or online as open access.
 The Center on Accessible Distance Learning (AccessDL), DO-IT Center, University of Washington

 
Educational television
Learning methods
Types of university or college
Education